Brachylia albida is a moth in the family Cossidae. It is found in Cameroon and the Democratic Republic of Congo.

References

Natural History Museum Lepidoptera generic names catalog

Cossinae
Moths described in 2011
Moths of Africa